Hale Township is a township in McLeod County, Minnesota, United States. The population was 957 at the 2000 census.

According to Warren Upham, Hale Township was named either for a local pioneer or for John P. Hale (1806–1873), an American politician.

Geography

Demographics
As of the census of 2000, there were 957 people, 335 households, and 275 families residing in the township. There were 343 housing units at an average density of 10.0/sq mi (3.9/km2). The racial makeup of the township was 98.85% White, 0.42% African American, 0.10% Native American, 0.00% Asian, 0.00% Pacific Islander, 0.42% from other races, and 0.21% from two or more races.  0.21% of the population were Hispanic or Latino of any race.

There were 335 households, out of which 36.1% had children under the age of 18 living with them, 71.6% were married couples living together, 4.5% had a female householder with no husband present, and 17.9% were non-families. 14.6% of all households were made up of individuals, and 6.6% had someone living alone who was 65 years of age or older.  The average household size was 2.86 and the average family size was 3.17.

In the township the population was spread out, with 26.9% under the age of 18, 6.7% from 18 to 24, 27.5% from 25 to 44, 25.2% from 45 to 64, and 13.8% who were 65 years of age or older.  The median age was 39 years. For every 100 females, there were 107.1 males.  For every 100 females age 18 and over, there were 108.3 males.

The median income for a household in the township was $50,446, and the median income for a family was $52,500. Males had a median income of $32,969 versus $24,632 for females. The per capita income for the township was $18,198.  About 4.2% of families and 5.7% of the population were below the poverty line, including 7.0% of those under age 18 and 6.8% of those age 65 or over.

References

Townships in McLeod County, Minnesota
Townships in Minnesota